The muon neutrino is an elementary particle which has the symbol and zero electric charge. Together with the muon it forms the second generation of leptons, hence the name muon neutrino. It was discovered in 1962 by Leon Lederman, Melvin Schwartz and Jack Steinberger. The discovery was rewarded with the 1988 Nobel Prize in Physics.

Discovery
The muon neutrino or "neutretto" was hypothesized to exist by a number of physicists in the 1940s.  The first paper on it may be Shoichi Sakata and Takesi Inoue's two-meson theory of 1942, which also involved two neutrinos.
In 1962 Leon M. Lederman, Melvin Schwartz and Jack Steinberger proved the existence of the muon neutrino in an experiment at the Brookhaven National Laboratory.  This earned them the 1988 Nobel Prize.

Speed

In September 2011 OPERA researchers reported that muon neutrinos were apparently traveling at faster than light speed. This result was confirmed again in a second experiment in November 2011. These results were viewed skeptically by the scientific community at large, and more experiments investigated the phenomenon. In March 2012 the ICARUS team published results directly contradicting the results of OPERA.

Later, in July 2012, the apparent anomalous super-luminous propagation of neutrinos was traced to a faulty element of the fibre optic timing system in Gran-Sasso. After it was corrected the neutrinos appeared to travel with the speed of light within the errors of the experiment.

See also
Electron neutrino
Neutrino oscillation
PMNS matrix
Tau neutrino

References

Further reading

Neutrinos
Leptons
Elementary particles